The Baldwin House in Lodge Grass, Montana, at 25 Third Ave., was built in 1918.  It was listed on the National Register of Historic Places in 1987.

It is a two-story wooden building with a jerkin head roof.  When built it was "undoubtedly one of the more substantial residences" in Lodge Grass.  It is one of few older houses surviving in the town.

References

National Register of Historic Places in Big Horn County, Montana
Houses completed in 1918
Houses on the National Register of Historic Places in Montana
1918 establishments in Montana
Houses in Big Horn County, Montana